The Bedchamber crisis occurred on 7 May 1839 after Whig politician William Lamb, 2nd Viscount Melbourne declared his intention to resign as Prime Minister of the United Kingdom after a government bill passed by a very narrow margin of only five votes in the House of Commons. Following a few false moves toward an alternative Tory prime minister and a Conservative government, Lord Melbourne was reinstated until the 1841 election, when the Conservative party took over.

The crisis occurred very early in the reign of Queen Victoria and involved her first change of government. She was partial to Melbourne, and resisted the requests of his rival Robert Peel to add to her household Tory ladies of the bedchamber (ladies-in-waiting) to replace some of the women who were close to the Whig party.

Overview 
After the Whig government bill passed by a narrow margin on 7 May 1839, the prime minister, William Lamb, 2nd Viscount Melbourne, declared his intention to resign. The distraught young Queen Victoria, whose political sympathies were with the Whigs, first asked the Duke of Wellington, a former Tory prime minister, to form a new government, but he politely declined. She then reluctantly invited Conservative leader Robert Peel to form a government. Peel realised that such a government would hold a minority in the House of Commons and would be structurally weak, possibly damaging his future political career.

Peel accepted the invitation on the condition that Victoria dismiss some of her ladies of the bedchamber, many of whom were wives or relatives of leading Whig politicians. She refused the request, considering her ladies as close friends, not as objects of political bargaining. Peel, therefore, refused to become prime minister and Melbourne was eventually persuaded to stay on as prime minister.

After Victoria's marriage to Prince Albert in 1840 she relied less on her ladies as companions. In the 1841 general election Peel's Conservatives gained a majority and Victoria appointed Peel as the new prime minister, a change of government for which Melbourne had meanwhile been preparing her. Accepting "the wise advice of the democratically minded Prince Albert", Victoria replaced three of her Whig ladies with Conservatives.

Aftermath 
At the time of the crisis Victoria was not yet twenty years old and had been on the throne less than two years. She was dismayed at the thought of losing her first, and so far only, Prime Minister, the avuncular Melbourne, a wise and kindly father-figure to her in the first years of her reign—her own father, the Duke of Kent, had died when she was an infant. Victoria also mistakenly assumed that Peel wanted to replace all of her ladies—her closest friends and companions at court—when in fact Peel wished to replace only six of the twenty-five ladies, but failed to make his intentions clear to Victoria.

Late in life Victoria regretted her youthful intransigence, writing to her private secretary, Arthur Bigge: "I was very young then, and perhaps I should act differently if it was all to be done again."

Fictional portrayals 
The Bedchamber crisis appears in the 1845 novel Sybil by Benjamin Disraeli. The crisis is depicted in the 2009 film The Young Victoria and the 2016 television-drama series Victoria.

References 

1839 in the United Kingdom
1839 in politics
British monarchy
Queen Victoria
Robert Peel